The Comancheros is a 1961 American CinemaScope Western film directed by Michael Curtiz, based on a 1952 novel of the same name by Paul Wellman, and starring John Wayne and Stuart Whitman. The supporting cast includes Ina Balin, Lee Marvin, Nehemiah Persoff, Bruce Cabot, Jack Elam, Joan O'Brien, Patrick Wayne, and Edgar Buchanan. Also featured are Western-film veterans Bob Steele, Guinn "Big Boy" Williams, and Harry Carey, Jr. in uncredited supporting roles.

When terminal illness prevented Curtiz (director of Casablanca and The Adventures of Robin Hood) from finishing the film, Wayne took over as director, though his direction remained uncredited. Curtiz died shortly after the film was completed.

Plot
In 1843, rogue gambler Paul Regret flees to avoid a death penalty after killing Emil Bouvier, the son of a Louisiana judge, in a duel. Regret maintains that he intended to wound Bouvier (who arranged the duel) in the arm, but Bouvier sidestepped. Regret is eventually captured by Texas Ranger Captain Jake Cutter after a tryst with a mysterious lady, Pilar Graile. Regret manages to escape, but is recaptured after a chance encounter with Cutter in a saloon.

While returning Regret to Louisiana, Cutter is forced to join forces with the condemned man to fight the "Comancheros", a large outlaw gang headed by a former officer who smuggles guns and whisky to the Comanche Indians, to make money and keep the frontier in a state of violence. Cutter stops at a ranch owned by a friend, when the Comanche attack suddenly. During the attack, Regret jumps on a horse and flees; however, instead of making a clean getaway, he returns with a company of Texas Rangers, who repulse the attack. Because of Regret's act of valour, the Rangers and a Texas judge agree to perjure themselves, stating that Regret could not have been involved in the duel because he was helping them spy out the Comanchero's supply line. Regret is then sworn in as an official Ranger.

After encountering one of the Comancheros' suppliers and killing him in self-defence, Cutter and Regret take over his delivery wagon and infiltrate the self-sufficient Comanchero community at the bottom of a valley in the desert. Pilar reappears as the daughter of the ruthless Comanchero leader Graile, who uses a wheelchair. He is soon killed by an old woman in the community after he orders the death of her son, and Cutter and the other Texas Rangers defeat the Comanche and Comancheros. Regret and Pilar leave together for Mexico, and Jake rides off into the sunset to rejoin the Ranger company.

Cast

 John Wayne as Capt. Jake Cutter
 Stuart Whitman as Paul Regret
 Ina Balin as Pilar Graile
 Nehemiah Persoff as Graile
 Lee Marvin as Tully Crow
 Michael Ansara as Amelung
 Bruce Cabot as Maj. Henry
 Joan O'Brien as Melinda Marshall
 Patrick Wayne as Tobe (Texas Ranger)
 Richard Devon as Estevan 
 Jack Elam as Horseface
 Henry Daniell as Gireaux 
 Edgar Buchanan as Judge Thaddeus Jackson Breen
 Guinn "Big Boy" Williams as Ed McBain (gunrunner)
 Bob Steele as Pa Schofield
 Leigh Snowden as  Evie – Blonde in Hotel Room (uncredited)
 George J. Lewis as Chief Iron Shirt (uncredited)

Production

Wellman's novel had been bought for the screen by George Stevens, who wanted to direct it after Giant (1956). He then became interested in making The Diary of Anne Frank and sold the film rights to Fox for $300,000. Clair Huffaker was signed by the studio to adapt it for producer Charles Brackett, with Gary Cooper to star. Robert Wagner was in line to play Cooper's co-star.

Cooper was in ill health and in early 1961 Douglas Heyes was announced as writer and director. John Wayne and Charlton Heston were announced as stars but Heston dropped out and was replaced by Tom Tryon, then Heyes dropped out and was replaced by Michael Curtiz. Fox had the script rewritten by Wayne's regular writer James Edward Grant.

Whitman, who later played a similar lead in the 1964 Rio Conchos, played the character Paul Regret, who was the lead in the novel, and Wayne's part had to be amplified for the film version. Wellman had envisioned Cary Grant as Regret as he wrote the novel. Gary Cooper and James Garner were originally set to be the leads but Cooper's ill health and Garner's blackballing over a dispute with Jack L. Warner ruled them out.

According to Tom Mankiewicz, who worked on the film as an assistant, Curtiz was often ill during production and John Wayne took over the directing. Wayne told Mankiewicz to remove his John F. Kennedy button.

Parts of the film were shot in Professor Valley, Dead Horse Point, King's Bottom, La Sal Mountains, Fisher Valley, Onion Creek, Hurrah Pass and Haver Ranch in Utah. Despite being set in Texas in 1843, all the characters use Winchester lever-action rifles and Colt Peacemaker pistols which were not in production until almost three decade later.

A tie in with the release was a comic book adaption from Dell which was published in Four Color #1300 (February 1962)

Claude King's version of the theme song was a top 10 country hit, and peaked at #71 on the pop charts in Billboard Magazine.

Reception
Bosley Crowther called the film "so studiously wild and woolly it turns out to be good fun"; according to Crowther, "[t]here's not a moment of seriousness in it, not a detail that isn't performed with a surge of exaggeration, not a character that is credible."

See also
 List of American films of 1961
 John Wayne filmography

References

External links
 
 
 
 
 

1961 films
1961 Western (genre) films
American Western (genre) films
1960s English-language films
Films directed by Michael Curtiz
Films directed by John Wayne
Films scored by Elmer Bernstein
20th Century Fox films
Films based on American novels
Films based on Western (genre) novels
Films set in 1843
Fiction set in 1843
Films set in Texas
Films shot in Utah
Films adapted into comics
CinemaScope films
1960s American films